Errol John Le Cain (5 March 1941 – 3 January 1989) was a British animator and children's book illustrator. In 1984 he won the prestigious Kate Greenaway Medal for "distinguished illustration in a book for children" for Hiawatha's Childhood (Faber and Faber).

Biography 

Descended from a French-Canadian great-grandfather, Le Cain was born 5 March 1941 to John and Minnie Le Cain in Singapore  but evacuated to Agra, India with his mother and other relations the following year to escape the Japanese invasion. His father was captured and interned in Changi Prison. Returning to Singapore after the war, he attended St. Patrick's Catholic School. With no formal art education, his talent was nevertheless evident from an early age; Le Cain was fascinated by cinema and made his first animated film, The Enchanted Mouse, with a friend's 8-mm camera at age 11. His next work, The Little Goatherd, was created with a 16-mm camera at age 15. This came to the attention of agents for British film distributor Pearl & Dean, who offered to pay his passage to London that year (1956) to pursue a career in animation for film and television.

In 1965 he joined the animation studio of Richard Williams, and in 1968 his first children's book was published. The following year he became a freelance illustrator and set designer for television. He married Dean Alison Thomson in 1976, after some time in Herne Bay the couple eventually settled in a suburb of Bristol with their two children. A committed Buddhist dating from his time in India, Errol le Cain died after a long illness on 3 January 1989, aged 47.

Animation and TV work 

In 1965, Le Cain joined Richard Williams's animation studio in London and was put to work on his first short film,  Sailor and The Devil (1967). Thereafter he worked on a wide range of animation projects, including film titles for A Funny Thing Happened on the Way to the Forum, Casino Royale, and The Charge of the Light Brigade. His most important work with Richard Williams was for the unfinished (1964 to 1992) animated film The Thief and the Cobbler.

Le Cain turned freelance in 1969, working on sets for BBC television productions, continuing with animation projects, and beginning his career as a children's book illustrator.

His animation work for the BBC began with a production of Hans Christian Andersen's The Snow Queen, first broadcast on BBC2 on Christmas Day 1976, using live actors over backdrops designed by Le Cain. A picture-book version of the story with his illustrations was published by Viking Kestrel in 1979. This production was followed by The Light Princess (broadcast 24 December 1978 BBC2), The Mystery of the Disappearing Schoolgirls (28 December 1980) and Leon Garfield's The Ghost Downstairs (broadcast 26 December 1982 on BBC2).

Children's book illustration 

According to Phyllis Hunt, Le Cain's long-term editor at Faber, the major part of his time was spent on his animation work and he regarded his children's books "as holidays".

Le Cain's first children's illustrations were published by Faber and Faber in a story he'd originally storyboarded for film, King Arthur's Sword (1968), which began a long association with Faber that continued to his death. His first book "made me aware of the scope and possibilities of children's book illustration, and now I am convinced this is the medium for me". Le Cain wrote 3 and illustrated 48 children's books during his lifetime, recognised for their richly decorative watercolours and masterful command of design and colour. His self-authored works were King Arthur's Sword (1968), The Cabbage Princess (1969) and The White Cat (1973). He was commended for the 1969, 1975, and 1978 Greenaway awards before winning the 1984 Medal and was commended again for 1987. The four commended books were The Cabbage Princess; Thorn Rose, or the Sleeping Beauty based on the version related by the Brothers Grimm;  The Twelve Dancing Princesses, retold from the Brothers Grimm; and The Enchanter's Daughter by Antonia Barber.

Selected children's books

As writer and illustrator
 King Arthur's Sword (Faber, 1968)
 The Cabbage Princess (Faber, 1969) —commended for the Kate Greenaway Medal
 The White Cat (Faber, 1973)

As illustrator only
 The Pleasantries of the Incredible Mulla Nasrudin, written by Idries Shah, illustrated by Richard Williams and Le Cain;(Jonathan Cape, 1968)
 Sir Orfeo, written by Anthea Davies (Faber, 1970)
 The Faber Book of Children's Songs, selected by Donald Mitchell and Roderick Biss (Faber, 1970)
 The Child in the Bamboo Grove, written by Rosemary Harris (Faber, 1971)
 Cinderella, adapted from Charles Perrault (Faber, 1972)
 The Beachcomers, written by Helen Cresswell (Faber, 1972)
 The King's White Elephant, written by Rosemary Harris (Faber, 1973)
 King Orville and the Bullfrogs, written by Kathleen Abell (Faber, 1974)
 Dragon Kite, written by Thomas P. Lewis (Holt, 1974)
 The Lotus and the Grail: Legends from East to West, written by Rosemary Harris (Faber, 1974)
 Thorn Rose, or the Sleeping Beauty, adapted from The Brothers Grimm (Faber, 1975) —commended for the Greenaway
 The Flying Ship, by Rosemary Harris  (Faber, 1975)
 The Rat, the Ox, and the Zodiac: A Chinese Legend, written by Dorothy Van Woerkom (Crown, 1976)
 The Little Dog of Fo, by Rosemary Harris (Faber, 1976)
 Puffin's Pleasure, written by Kaye Webb and Treld Bicknell (Le Cain contributor), (Puffin, 1976)
 The Shy Cormorant and the Fishes, written by Brian Patten (Kestrel, 1977)
 The Twelve Dancing Princesses, adapted from The Brothers Grimm (Faber, 1978) —commended for the Greenaway
 Beauty and The Beast, adapted from Charles Perrault (Faber, 1979)
 The Snow Queen, adapted from Hans Christian Andersen by Naomi Lewis (Viking Kestrel, 1979)
 The Three Magic Gifts, written by James Riordan (Kaye & Ward, 1980)
 Mrs Fox's Wedding, retold by Sara and Stephen Corrin (Faber, 1980)
 Aladdin and the Wonderful Lamp, retold by Andrew Lang (Faber, 1981)
 Molly Whuppie, written by Walter De La Mare (Faber, 1983)
 Hiawatha's Childhood, selected from Henry Wadsworth Longfellow (Faber, 1984) —winner of the Greenaway Medal
 Growltiger's Last Stand and Other Poems, written by T.S. Eliot (Faber, 1986)
 Crisis at Crabtree, written by Sally Miles (Lutterworth Press, 1986)
 A School Bewitched, written by Naomi Lewis and E. Nesbit (Macmillan, 1986)
 The Enchanter's Daughter, written by Antonia Barber (Cape, 1986) —commended for the Greenaway
 The Christmas Stockings, written by Mathew Price (Mathew Price / Barrons Juveniles, 1987)
 Christmas 1993 or Santa's Last Ride, written by Leslie Bricusse (Faber, 1987)
 Alfi and the Dark, written by Sally Miles (Hodder & Stoughton, 1988)
 The Pied Piper of Hamelin, retold by Sara and Stephen Corrin (Faber, 1988)
 Mr Mistoffelees with Mungojerrie and Rumpelteazer, written by T.S. Eliot (Faber, 1990)
 Have You Seen My Sister?, written by Mathew Price (Kingfisher / Harcourt, 1990)

Notes

References

Citations
 Errol Le Cain, The Enchanter of Images (Holp Shuppan, Japan 1992)
 Veronica Ortenberg West-Harling, "Errol Le Cain's Fairy Tales as Manuscript Illustration", in Cahier Calin: Makers of the Middle Ages. Essays in Honor of William Calin, ed. Richard Utz and Elizabeth Emery (Kalamazoo, MI: Studies in Medievalism, 2011), pp. 33–35

External links 
 
 Collecting Errol Le Cain - A Complete Illustrated Bibliography
 The Illustrated Work of Errol Le Cain (errollecain.com), archived 2012-06-05
 Books for Keeps Interview with Penny Sibson, Issue 47. 1987.
 Errol Le Cain Legacy fan site
 
 Obituary tribute  by Phyllis Hunt in Books for Keeps Issue 55

British illustrators
British animators
British children's book illustrators
20th-century illustrators of fairy tales
Kate Greenaway Medal winners
1941 births
1989 deaths